The following is an alphabetical list of the islands of Greenland. Many of these islands have both a Kalaallisut language name and a European language name.

Islands and archipelagoes 

Aaluik
Aasiaat Archipelago
Achton Friis Islands
Aggas
Akilia
Alluttoq Island
Aluk Island
Ammassalik Island
Appat Island
Apusiaajik Island
ATOW1996
Beaumont Island
Bjorne Island
Bjorne Islands
Bonsall Islands
Bontekoe Island
Borup Island (West Jensen Island)
Brainard Island
Bushnan Island
Cape Farewell Archipelago
Annikitsoq
Anoraliuirsoq
Avallersuaq
Egger Island
Ikeq Island
Nunarsuaq (Nunarssuak)
Pamialluk
Qernertoq
Sammisoq
Saningassoq
Walkendorff Island
Carey Islands
Castle Island, Greenland
Clavering Island
Crown Prince Islands
Crozier Island
Danmark Island
Danske Islands
Deception Island (Greenland)
Diego's Island
Djævleøen
Dog's Island
Edward Island
Elison Island
Ella Island
Ensomheden
Finsch Islands
Franklin Island
Franske Islands
Gamma Island (Bjornesk Island)
Geographical Society Island
George Island
Godfred Hansen Island
Graah Archipelago
Dannebrog Island
Ittit
Simîtakajâ
Greenland
Griffenfeld Island
Hakluyt Island
Hannah Island
Hanne Island
Hans Island
Hareoen Island
Harvard Islands
Hazenland
Hendrik Island
Henrik Krøyer Holme
Hornemann Island
Hovgaard Island
Igdluluarssuk
Ikerasak Island
Illorsuit Island (Ubekendt Ejland)
Iluileq
Île-de-France (Greenland)
Imaarsivik
Immikkoortukajik
Inge Island
Ingjald Island
Inner Kitsissut
Inussullissuaq Island
Ivingmiut
Jackson Island
Joe Island (Greenland)
John Murray Island
Josephine Peary Island
Kaffeklubben Island
Kanajoorartuut
Kiatak (Northumberland Island)
Kiatassuaq
Kitak
Kitsissut Islands
Kook Islands
Kronprinsen Ejland
Kuhn Island
Kulusuk Island
Lindhards Island
Little Pendulum Island
Littleton Island
Lockwood Island
Luigi Amadeo Island
Lynn Island
McGary Islands
MacMillan Island
Maniitsoq Island
Maria Island (Greenland)
Melville Monument (Greenland)
Meteorite Island
Milne Land
Nanortalik Island
Nanuuseq
Nares Land
Norske Islands
Offley Island
Ole Romer Island
Oodaaq
Otto Rud Islands
Outer Kitsissut
Permin Land
Princess Dagmar Island
Princess Margaret Island
Princess Thyra Island
Qajartalik
Qassimiut Islands
Qeertartivaq
Qeertartivatsiaq
Qeqertaq
Qeqertaq Avannarleq
Qeqertarssdaq
Qeqertarsuaq Island (Nuuk)
Qeqertarsuaq (Disko Island)
Qeqertarsuaq (Herbert Island)
Qeqertarsuatsiaq Island
Qianarreq
Qiianarteq
Qoornuup Qeqertarsua
Queen Louise Island
Qutdleq
Raffles Island
Romer Island (Rømer Ø)
Ruth Island
Sabine Island
Salleq Island
Salliaruseq Island (Storøen)
Salve Island

Saunders Island, Greenland
Schnauder Island
Sermersooq Island
Sermersut Island
Sermitsiaq Island
Shannon Island
Simiutaq Island (West coast)
Simiutaq Island (SW coast)
Skal Island (Skalø)
Skjoldungen
Soren Norby Islands
Stephenson Island (Greenland)
Steward Island
Store Koldewey
Storo (Greenland)
Sutherland Island
Suunikajik
Sverdrup Island (Greenland)
Talerua Island
Takiseeq
Timmiarmiit
Tobias Island
Traill Island
Trefoldigheden
Turner Island

Ujuaakajiip Nunaa
Upepnagssivik
Upernivik Island
Upernattivik
Uttorsiutit
Uummannaq Island
Uummannaarsuk
Uunartoq Island
Uunartoq Qeqertaq
Valkyrie Islands
Wolstenholme Island
Ymer Island
83-42

Upernavik Archipelago 

Aappilattoq (Upernavik Icefjord)  Aappilattoq (Tasiusaq Bay)  Akia    Akuliaruseq  Amarortalik  Amitsorsuaq  Anarusuk  Apparsuit  Atilissuaq  Aukarnersuaq  Ateqanngitsorsuaq  Horse Head  Ikerasakassak  Ikermoissuaq  Ikermiut  Illunnguit  Innaarsuit  Inussullissuaq   Iperaq  Itissaalik  Kangaarsuk  Karrat  Kiatassuaq  Kiataussaq  Kingittorsuaq  Kullorsuaq   Maniitsoq  Mattaangassut Mernoq  Naajaat  Nako  Nasaussaq  Nuluuk  Nunaa  Nunatarsuaq  Nutaarmiut  Nutaarmiut (Tasiusaq Bay)  Nuuluk  Paagussat  Paornivik  Puugutaa  Qaarsorsuaq  Qaarsorsuatsiaq  Qallunaat  Qaneq  Qaqaarissorsuaq  Qasse   Qeqertaq  Qeqertarsuaq  Qullikorsuit  Saarlia  Saattoq  Saattorsuaq  Saattup Akia  Sanningassoq  Saqqarlersuaq  Singarnaq-Annertussoq  Sisuarsuit  Sugar Loaf  Taartoq  Tasiusaq  Timilersua   Tukingassoq  Tussaaq  Tuttorqortooq  Uigorlersuaq  Uilortussoq  Upernavik

Mythical or phantom islands 
Buss Island
Fata Morgana Land
Groclant
Thule

See also 

Greenland
Geography of Greenland
List of Greenland-related topics
List of islands by area
List of islands by highest point
List of islands by population
List of islands in lakes

External links 

Islands of Greenland @ United Nations Environment Programme

World island information @ WorldIslandInfo.com

 
Islands
Greenland